Children of God may refer to:

In religion
People of God, a religious concept
Divine filiation, the Christian concept of becoming a child of God
The New Forest Shakers, an 1870s and 1880s English religious sect also known as the "Children of God"
The Family International, a US religious sect originally known as the "Children of God"

Arts and entertainment
Children of God (novel), a 1998 science fiction novel by Mary Doria Russell
Children of God (film), a 2010 film directed and written by Kareem Mortimer
Children of God (Swans album), 1987
Children of God (Phil Wickham album), 2016
"Children of God", a song by Eyehategod, from the 1992 album In the Name of Suffering
"Children of God," a song by Third Day, from the 2010 album Move
"Children of God," a song by Andrew Jackson Jihad, from the 2014 album Christmas Island

Other uses
Harijan, or "children of God", a Hindi term Mohandas Gandhi used for dalits

See also
 God's Children (disambiguation)
 Child of God, a 1973 novel by Cormac McCarthy